XL Recordings is a British independent record label founded in 1989 by Tim Palmer and Nick Halkes. It has been run and co-owned by Richard Russell since 1996. It forms part of the Beggars Group.

Although only releasing an average of six albums a year, XL has worked with Adele, Arca, Azealia Banks, Basement Jaxx, Beck, Dizzee Rascal, Electric Six, FKA Twigs, Giggs, Gil Scott-Heron, Gotan Project, The Horrors, Yaeji, Jai Paul, Jungle, King Krule, Lemon Jelly, M.I.A., Nines, Peaches, The Prodigy, Radiohead, Sampha, SBTRKT, Sigur Rós, Tyler, the Creator, Vampire Weekend, The White Stripes and The xx. The label releases albums worldwide and operates across a range of genres.

History

1980s and 1990s
The label was launched in 1989 to release rave and dance music. It was originally an imprint of Beggars Banquet's more commercial dance label Citybeat, which was known for records by acts such as Freeez, Rob Base & EZ Rock, Starlight, Dream Frequency and the Ultramagnetic MCs. However, with the success of acts such as The Prodigy and SL2, XL superseded Citybeat in its lineup.

During the early 1990s, XL releases were dance oriented ranging from Belgian techno (T99's "Anasthasia") to breakbeat hardcore (SL2's "On a Ragga Tip") to drum and bass (Jonny L's "I'm Leavin'"). This period of XL's history has been recorded on the XL Recordings Chapters compilation series. In 1993, Halkes left XL to form the EMI-owned commercial dance label Positiva, and subsequently his own independent commercial dance label Incentive. After Palmer retired in 1996, Russell took over the running of the business.

Russell later broadened the musical horizons of the label, whilst maintaining a credo of working with artists he saw as original and inventive. In 1994, the label released The Prodigy's second album, Music for the Jilted Generation which debuted in the UK Albums Chart at number one, and in 1997 it released the third album by The Prodigy, The Fat of the Land which entered the British and American charts at number one and went on to be number one in 26 countries.

2000s
June 2000 saw the release of Badly Drawn Boy's The Hour of Bewilderbeast which won the 2000 Mercury Music Prize. The next year, The White Stripes third album White Blood Cells was released together with reissues of the band's previous albums, The White Stripes and De Stijl. In 2003 XL Recordings won the Music Week A&R award, and also released The White Stripes fourth album Elephant which was their first UK number one album and eventually reached double platinum certification in Britain. In the same year XL released Dizzee Rascal's first solo album, Boy in da Corner for which Dizzee was awarded the Mercury Prize for the best album of 2003.

In March 2005, M.I.A.'s debut album Arular was released after several months' delay. Thom Yorke, from Radiohead, released his first solo record, The Eraser, on the label in July 2006. In October 2007, Radiohead completed negotiations to sign with XL for physical release of their seventh studio album, In Rainbows. Radiohead subsequently went on to release through XL, and have so far released everything since their eighth studio album The King Of Limbs on the label. As director of XL Recordings, Richard Russell was included in a 2007 Evening Standard list of the most influential people in London, and in August of that year M.I.A.'s second album Kala was released—Rolling Stone named it the ninth best album of the decade.

In March 2008 XL added Friendly Fires and The Horrors. In 2009 the label won the "Music Week" Best Independent Label award; Adele won the awards for Best New Artist and Best Female Pop Vocal Performance at the 51st Annual Grammy Awards, and at the same ceremony Radiohead won Best Alternative Album for In Rainbows as well as Best Boxed or Special Edition Album. Also in 2009, The xx's debut album xx was released on XL Recordings partner label Young, and in September Giggs was signed.

2010s
On 11 January 2010, XL Recordings released Vampire Weekend's second album Contra. It was the band's first album to reach number one on the US Billboard 200. Gil Scott-Heron's thirteenth studio album I'm New Here was released in February; it was Scott-Heron's first release of original material in sixteen years and proved to be his last studio album. Recording sessions for the album took place between 2007 and 2009 and production was handled by XL Recordings-owner Richard Russell.

In July, XL signed Jai Paul, who was shortlisted for BBC's Sound of 2011, and in September the xx's eponymous debut album won the Barclaycard Mercury Prize, acquiring best British and Irish album of the year.

On 24 January 2011, XL Recordings released the album 21 by Adele. In February the (then) 19-year-old OFWGKTA member Tyler, the Creator was signed for a one-album deal for his debut studio album and commercial debut Goblin. Singer Gil Scott-Heron died in May and his final recordings, "I'm New Here" (produced by Richard Russell), and the remix album, "We're New Here" made with Jamie xx were released on XL Recordings. The label also released new albums by Radiohead, Friendly Fires, and The Horrors and singles by Jai Paul and Portishead, as well as the Adele Blu-ray/DVD, Live at the Royal Albert Hall.

On 24 April 2012, XL released Blunderbuss, the debut solo record by Jack White. It entered the UK album charts at number one, displacing 21 by Adele.
In 2012, XL Recordings was named 'Label of the Year' at the Music Week Awards in London. XL also won awards for 'Best A&R' and 'Best Artist Campaign'. Label head, Richard Russell, became the youngest ever recipient of the lifetime achievement 'Strat Award'.

Sales of Adele's 21 helped increase XL Recordings' bank balance from £3 million to £32 million in the space of 12 months. As of March 2011, XL Recordings had released three albums that had sold over a million copies in the UK: The Prodigy's The Fat of the Land, Adele's 19, and Adele's 21.

In April 2016, Radiohead's Parlophone albums transferred to XL Recordings. A month later, on 8 May, the band released their ninth studio album, A Moon Shaped Pool, through XL to critical acclaim.

XL Studio 
In early 2008, Russell transformed the rear garage of the label's Ladbroke Grove headquarters into a small, in-house recording and mixing studio called XL Studio. It served as a makeshift studio space for the label's various artists and his own projects until producer Rodaidh McDonald was assigned in September of that year to manage and properly equip it in preparation for The xx to record their self-titled debut album. According to McDonald, "before Richard brought me in to be Studio Manager, it was just a bit of a free-for-all. Artists could come in and rehearse, demo or write here and things like that ... but it was good idea and we decided we should be stepping it up and making records here." Russell and McDonald were inspired by the success of modest studios such as Hitsville U.S.A. and wanted to create an economic, non-commercial space.

Set up specifically with the xx in mind, XL Studio features little outboard gear and is equipped with a Neotek Élan custom 24-channel mixing console, Yamaha NS10 studio monitors, and instruments that include an upright piano, Roland Juno-60, Moog Prodigy, Vox Continental organ, and Sequential Circuits Pro-One synthesizer. Russell and McDonald augmented the studio to twice its original size after the xx's album, which was done in what became the studio's control room; they incorporated an adjacent office as the studio's live room for musicians.

In 2016, the WSDG completed the construction of a new recording studio in the basement of the XL Recordings offices in New York City.

Roster

Notable artists
As of 2023, XL Recordings is home to a range of artists including:

 Arca
 BadBadNotGood
 CASisDEAD
 Richard Russell
 Ibeyi
 Jack Peñate
 Jack White
 Jai Paul
 Joy Orbison 
 Jungle
 Kenny Beats
 King Krule / Archy Marshall
 Låpsley

 Makaya McCraven
 Nines
 Radiohead
 Ratatat
 Ratking
 Rostam
 Sigur Rós
 Smerz
 Special Request
 The Smile
 Thom Yorke
 Yaeji
 Zomby

Alumni

 Adele
 Atoms for Peace
 Azealia Banks
 The Avalanches
 Basement Jaxx
 Badly Drawn Boy
 Be Your Own Pet
 Beck
 Bobby Womack
 Blue Roses / Laura Groves
 Capitol K
 Dizzee Rascal
 Discovery
 East India Youth
 Electric Six
 Eyedress
 Friendly Fires
 Giggs
 Gil Scott-Heron
 Golden Silvers
 Gotan Project
 Holly Miranda
 The Horrors
 House of Pain
 Iceage
 Karen Elson
 Kaytranada
 Kirin J Callinan
 Kwes
 Leila

 Lemon Jelly
 Liquid
 Magistrates
 M.I.A.
 Monsta Boy
 Novelist
 Nu-Birth
 Peaches
 The Prodigy
 QT
 RJD2
 Roy Davis Jr. feat. Peven Everett
 Shamir
 SL2
 Super Furry Animals
 Sunless '97
 The Cool Kids
 Titus Andronicus
 The Streets
 Tyler, The Creator
 Various Production
 Vampire Weekend
 Wiki
 Wiley
 Willis Earl Beal
 Zongamin

See also

Affiliated labels/imprints
 Paul Institute
 Young

Formerly affiliated labels/imprints
 Kaya Kaya Records
 Terrible
 Locked On

Inactive affiliated labels/imprints
 Abeano
 Concept In Dance 
 HXC Recordings
 Merok Records
 New Gen
 Ore Music
 Platinum Projects
 Rex Records
 Salvia

Other
 List of electronic music record labels
 List of independent UK record labels
 List of record labels

References

External links
 
 
 Interview with Richard Russell, HitQuarters Sep 2008

Record labels established in 1989
Electronic music record labels
Drum and bass record labels
English electronic dance music record labels
Alternative rock record labels
British independent record labels
Indie rock record labels
Pop record labels
Beggars Group